Lars Jonas Nilsson (born 7 March 1963 in Hedemora, Dalarna) is a Swedish former alpine skier. He was born in Hedemora, which is located in Sweden. He competed at three Winter Olympics.

He raced in the Alpine Skiing World Cup from 1983 to 1992, obtaining two victories, both in slalom. He won the gold medal in Alpine World Ski Championships of 1985, in the same discipline.

World Cup victories

References

1963 births
Swedish male alpine skiers
People from Hedemora Municipality
Living people
Olympic alpine skiers of Sweden
Alpine skiers at the 1984 Winter Olympics
Alpine skiers at the 1988 Winter Olympics
Alpine skiers at the 1992 Winter Olympics
Sportspeople from Dalarna County